The Borzeşti Power Station is a large thermal power plant in Borzeşti, Romania, containing seven generation groups, three of 25 MW, two of 50 MW, one of 60 MW and one of 210 MW, having a total electricity generation capacity of 655 MW.

See also
Borzești Petrochemical Plant

References

External links
Description 

Natural gas-fired power stations in Romania